uPhongolo Local Municipality, is a local municipality in the northern area of Zululand, in the South African province of KwaZulu-Natal.

In 2007, the uPhongolo Municipality contained 154 rural shops, 124 schools, 27 hotels, resorts or conference facilities, 15 clinics, 12 recreational facilities, 6 community halls, 4 post offices, 2 police stations, and 2 law courts.  The municipality is largely composed of traditional areas, with tribal land patterns and high density rural settlements.  82% of the population lives in rural areas.

Geography
The N2 national road corridor passes through the uPhongolo area as a national link between Gauteng and the Richards Bay complex, and on to Durban in the south. It also connects with Eswatini just to the north of the uPhongolo Municipal area. This is the primary development corridor in uPhongolo.

The two main rivers in the municipality are the Mkuze River in the south and the Phongolo River in the north, the latter feeding the Pongolapoort Dam, located on the eastern boundary of the municipality.

The Phongolo River rises just east of Wakkerstroom and drains an area of nearly 8,000 km² where the rainfall often exceeds 1,000 mm a year. Because the irrigation weir at Pongola could not fully regulate the river's erratic water flow, the 89-meter-high Pongolapoort Dam wall was built in 1972 in a narrow gorge in the Lebombo Mountains. Phongolo is the Zulu word for "trough," referring to the many deep pools with steep sides along the river's course. 
Also located near Eswatini.

Economy
Agriculture and tourism form the basis for the municipality’s economy. Major development components consist of game and nature reserves, agricultural activities, traditional settlement areas and some urban nodes.

The public sector is the dominant provider of employment opportunities.  However, the informal sector is expanding, primarily based on the taxi industry, informal financial services and taverns.

Large areas of sugarcane and citrus are cultivated in the region.

The uPhongolo Municipality provides regional access to a wide range of tourist activities outside its own boundaries.  It has within its area of jurisdiction two key tourist attractions:  the Ithala Game Reserve and the Pongolapoort Dam. These attractions are complemented by a large number of private game farms and game reserves, on which a number of lodges and other tourist facilities are located.

Average income levels are low, with 66% of households receiving no income or less than R2400 per month. The traditional and rural areas are the most poverty stricken.  Unemployment levels are relatively high; only 13.43% of the population are formally employed.  Close to half of the population are children, placing pressure on the need for educational and social facilities. Many of these children are orphaned as a result of HIV/AIDS.

Politics 

The municipal council consists of twenty-nine members elected by mixed-member proportional representation. Fifteen councillors are elected by first-past-the-post voting in fifteen wards, while the remaining fourteen are chosen from party lists so that the total number of party representatives is proportional to the number of votes received. In the election of 1 November 2021 the Inkatha Freedom Party (IFP) won a majority of fifteen seats.
The following table shows the results of the election.

Main places
The 2001 census divided the municipality into the following main places:

References

External links
 Official website

Local municipalities of the Zululand District Municipality